The 1938 Duke Blue Devils football team represented the Duke Blue Devils of Duke University during the 1938 college football season.  They were led by head coach Wallace Wade, who was in his eighth season at the school. Known as the "Iron Dukes", the 1938 Blue Devils went undefeated and unscored upon during the entire regular season, earning them the Southern Conference championship.

Duke was invited to the Rose Bowl against the USC Trojans. In what was the Blue Devils' first bowl game appearance, the contest was a scoreless defensive battle until early in the fourth quarter, when Duke kicked a field goal to take a 3–0 lead. However, USC threw a touchdown pass with one minute left to score the first and only points allowed by Duke during the season and win the game.

Schedule

References

Duke
Duke Blue Devils football seasons
Southern Conference football champion seasons
Duke Blue Devils football